Takydromus yunkaiensis, the Yunkai grass lizard, is a species of lizard in the family Lacertidae. It is endemic to China.

References

Takydromus
Reptiles described in 2019
Endemic fauna of China
Reptiles of China